Isaac Allerton (c. 1586 – 1658/9) was a Mayflower pilgrim.

Isaac Allerton may also refer to:

Isaac Allerton, Jr (1627–1702)
Isaac Allerton (shipwreck)